In bioinformatics, sequence analysis is the process of subjecting a DNA, RNA or peptide sequence to any of a wide range of analytical methods to understand its features, function, structure, or evolution. Methodologies used include sequence alignment, searches against biological databases, and others. 

Since the development of methods of high-throughput production of gene and protein sequences, the rate of addition of new sequences to the databases increased very rapidly. Such a collection of sequences does not, by itself, increase the scientist's understanding of the biology of organisms. However, comparing these new sequences to those with known functions is a key way of understanding the biology of an organism from which the new sequence comes. Thus, sequence analysis can be used to assign function to genes and proteins by the study of the similarities between the compared sequences. Nowadays, there are many tools and techniques that provide the sequence comparisons (sequence alignment) and analyze the alignment product to understand its biology.

Sequence analysis in molecular biology includes a very wide range of relevant topics:

The comparison of sequences in order to find similarity, often to infer if they are related (homologous)
Identification of intrinsic features of the sequence such as active sites, post translational modification sites,  gene-structures, reading frames, distributions of introns and exons and regulatory elements
Identification of sequence differences and variations such as point mutations and single nucleotide polymorphism (SNP) in order to get the genetic marker.
Revealing the evolution and genetic diversity of sequences and organisms
Identification of molecular structure from sequence alone

In chemistry, sequence analysis comprises techniques used to determine the sequence of a polymer formed of several monomers (see Sequence analysis of synthetic polymers).
In molecular biology and genetics, the same process is called simply "sequencing".

In marketing, sequence analysis is often used in analytical customer relationship management applications, such as NPTB models (Next Product to Buy).

In social sciences and in sociology in particular, sequence methods are increasingly used to study life-course and career trajectories, time use, patterns of organizational and national development, conversation and interaction structure, and the problem of work/family synchrony. This body of research is described under sequence analysis in social sciences.

History 

Since the very first sequences of the insulin protein were characterized by Fred Sanger in 1951, biologists have been trying to use this knowledge to understand the function of molecules. He and his colleagues' discoveries contributed to the successful sequencing of the first DNA-based genome. The method used in this study, which is called the “Sanger method” or Sanger sequencing, was a milestone in sequencing long strand molecules such as DNA. This method was eventually used in the human genome project.  According to Michael Levitt, sequence analysis was born in the period from 1969–1977. In 1969 the analysis of sequences of transfer RNAs was used to infer residue interactions from correlated changes in the nucleotide sequences, giving rise to a model of the tRNA secondary structure. In 1970, Saul B. Needleman and Christian D. Wunsch published the first computer algorithm for aligning two sequences. Over this time, developments in obtaining nucleotide sequence improved greatly, leading to the publication of the first complete genome of a bacteriophage in 1977. Robert Holley and his team in Cornell University were believed to be the first to sequence an RNA molecule.

Sequence alignment 
 

There are millions of protein and nucleotide sequences known. These sequences fall into many groups of related sequences known as protein families or gene families.  Relationships between these sequences are usually discovered by aligning them together and assigning this alignment a score. There are two main types of sequence alignment. Pair-wise sequence alignment only compares two sequences at a time and multiple sequence alignment compares many sequences. Two important algorithms for aligning pairs of sequences are the Needleman-Wunsch algorithm and the Smith-Waterman algorithm. Popular tools for sequence alignment include: 
Pair-wise alignment - BLAST, Dot plots 
Multiple alignment - ClustalW, PROBCONS, MUSCLE, MAFFT, and  T-Coffee.
A common use for pairwise sequence alignment is to take a sequence of interest and compare it to all known sequences in a database to identify homologous sequences. In general, the matches in the database are ordered to show the most closely related sequences first, followed by sequences with diminishing similarity. These matches are usually reported with a measure of statistical significance such as an Expectation value.

Profile comparison
In 1987, Michael Gribskov, Andrew McLachlan, and David Eisenberg introduced the method of profile comparison for identifying distant similarities between proteins. Rather than using a single sequence, profile methods use a multiple sequence alignment to encode a profile which contains information about the conservation level of each residue. These profiles can then be used to search collections of sequences to find sequences that are related. Profiles are also known as Position Specific Scoring Matrices (PSSMs). In 1993, a probabilistic interpretation of profiles was introduced by Anders Krogh and colleagues using hidden Markov models. These models have become known as profile-HMMs.

In recent years, methods have been developed that allow the comparison of profiles directly to each other. These are known as profile-profile comparison methods.

Sequence assembly 

Sequence assembly refers to the reconstruction of a DNA sequence by aligning and merging small DNA  fragments. It is an integral part of modern DNA sequencing. Since presently-available DNA sequencing technologies are ill-suited for reading long sequences, large pieces of DNA (such as genomes) are often sequenced by (1) cutting the DNA into small pieces, (2) reading the small fragments, and (3) reconstituting the original DNA by merging the information on various fragments.

Recently, sequencing multiple species at one time is one of the top research objectives. Metagenomics is the study of microbial communities directly obtained from the environment. Different from cultured microorganisms from the lab, the wild sample usually contains dozens, sometimes even thousands of types of microorganisms from their original habitats. Recovering the original genomes can prove to be very challenging.

Gene prediction 

Gene prediction or gene finding refers to the process of identifying the regions of genomic DNA that encode genes. This includes protein-coding genes as well as RNA genes, but may also include the prediction of other functional elements such as regulatory regions. Geri is one of the first and most important steps in understanding the genome of a species once it has been sequenced. In general, the prediction of bacterial genes is significantly simpler and more accurate than the prediction of genes in eukaryotic species that usually have complex intron/exon patterns. Identifying genes in long sequences remains a problem, especially when the number of genes is unknown. Hidden markov models can be part of the solution. Machine learning has played a significant role in predicting the sequence of transcription factors. Traditional sequencing analysis focused on the statistical parameters of the nucleotide sequence itself (The most common programs used are listed in Table 4.1). Another method is to identify homologous sequences based on other known gene sequences (Tools see Table 4.3).  The two methods described here are focused on the sequence. However, the shape feature of these molecules such as DNA and protein have also been studied and proposed to have an equivalent, if not higher, influence on the behaviors of these molecules.

Protein structure prediction 

The 3D structures of molecules are of major importance to their functions in nature. Since structural prediction of large molecules at an atomic level is a largely intractable problem, some biologists introduced ways to predict 3D structure at a primary sequence level. This includes the biochemical or statistical analysis of amino acid residues in local regions and structural the inference from homologs (or other potentially related proteins) with known 3D structures.

There have been a large number of diverse approaches to solve the structure prediction problem.  In order to determine which methods were most effective, a structure prediction competition was founded called CASP (Critical Assessment of Structure Prediction).

Methodology 

The tasks that lie in the space of sequence analysis are often non-trivial to resolve and require the use of relatively complex approaches. Of the many types of methods used in practice, the most popular include:
 Dynamic programming
 Artificial Neural Network
 Hidden Markov Model
 Support Vector Machine
 Clustering
 Bayesian Network
 Regression Analysis
 Sequence mining
 Alignment-free sequence analysis

See also
Fourier transform
Least-squares spectral analysis
List of sequence alignment software
List of alignment visualization software
List of phylogenetics software
List of phylogenetic tree visualization software
List of protein structure prediction software
List of RNA structure prediction software
Sequence analysis in social sciences

References

Bioinformatics